or  is a valley in the municipality of Rana in Nordland county, Norway. The valley is located on the eastern side of the Svartisen glacier, and partly within the Saltfjellet–Svartisen National Park. The Blakkåga river flows through the valley.

References

Valleys of Nordland
Rana, Norway